Jalalpur Bhattian, is a city in the Hafizabad District of Pakistan.

History 
There are many traditions related to origin of Jalalpur Bhatian.It is said that the foundation of this town was laid between 1290 and 1295 during the reign of Jalaluddin Khalji .After the destruction of the present Jalalpur before 3 centuries , it came into being as a new city that is why it is still called Jalalpur nau in the records of the Revenue Department and the Postal Department.

However, due to the establishment of an influential population of the Bhatti community here, Bhatti caste pressurized common people to call jalalpur nau as a bhatti city and this name became famous as jalalpur bhattain . 

In past Sher Shah Suri ordered to build a highway that connected Jammu to Multan which passes through jalalpur . On this highway, outposts, inns and wells were built here . During the akbar,s era, when Akbar's cousin Hakim Muhammad Mirza raised the awareness of rebellion and was able to march from Lahore, he used to pass through Jalalpur through this highway. During the Mughal era, Qazi Court was also established here. In 1802, Maharaja Ranjit Singh attacked it. The town was looted and the local owners were deprived of their property. The Bhatti tribe went to Jhang, the Khatris occupied it, when the British took action to subdue Sardar Chatar Singh and Sher Singh Atariwalaki, the Bhatti tribe settled once again. The city was surrounded by a strong wall, a trench was dug around the wall, in which the waste water of the town collected and fell into the storm drain.

A municipal committee was established in 1888 during the Lordship period in Jalalpuno, which was dissolved in 1891, in 1959 it was given the status of a union council and in 1979 a town committee. In 1952, to prevent the flood water of river Chenab, Jalalpur to Winiki Tarar (Band) was constructed from Pindi Bhattian and a paved road was built on this dam to connect Jalalpur to Winiki Tarar.On the other hand, it was connected to Sukhiki through a road. The grain market in Jalalpur Bhattian, which has been running since the Mughal era, has now become a large and international market. The elders said that in the inner grain market (old), the former vice chairman of the municipality and rice export Haji. Abdul Sattar Arain's father, Haji Muhammad Nazir, Haji Amanat Ali Rajput, Haji Imam Ali Arain, Malik Muhammad Nazir of Solangi, Haji Nabi Bakhsh Seth, Sheikh Noor Muhammad and Muhammad Hussain, father of the late Dr. Muhammad Amjad, etc., were a few people who were in the business of Ahad, around 1963 in the same old grain market. The first financial institution was established in Habib Bank Limited. In those good times, wheat was sold at Rs. 9 to 12 per maund, while wheat was sold at Rs. 13 to 15 per maund.

Villagers used to irrigate the crops from wells, plow them with their hands and load them on donkeys to bring them to the market. This was in the days when the late Chaudhry Zahoor Elahi, father of former Punjab Chief Minister Chaudhry Parvez Elahi, worked as a secretary (editor) in Jalalpur Bhatian police station and Actor Abid Khan's father used to work as an SHO in the same police station. The history of Jalalpur Bhattian also includes that the grandfather of today's famous Indian film actor Hrithik Roshan, Roshan Das, used to run a cloth shop in the bazaar of this city before the establishment of Pakistan. 

( By Shahzaib Wazeer)

References

. 
Populated places in Hafizabad District